The Romeo and Juliet effect describes the intensification of romantic feelings in relationship when met by parental opposition, as coined by British actor and director Richard Driscoll referencing the protagonists of the William Shakespeare play Romeo and Juliet, whose families were opposed to their union.

History
An early review of romantic love in the Western world emphasized the persistent association of obstacles or grave difficulties with the intensity of love, as in William Shakespeare's Romeo and Juliet. 

In 1972, Richard Driscoll, along with Keith Davis and Milton Lipetz, published results from a longitudinal study on relationships suggesting an underlying truth to such an idea. The results suggest that parental interference in a loving relationship may intensify the feelings of romantic love between members of the couple, at least for a brief span of time. The study interviewed 140 couples, both married and unmarried, via questionnaires and surveys. The researchers measured feelings about the spouse, about their perceived love, spousal trustworthiness, neediness, and parental interference. The couples completed these procedures at a first session and then, around six months to a year later, completed identical surveying sessions to see how their relationships have endured the past months. About 80% of the original participants completed the second session. Only a small portion of the original sample had ended their relationships or gotten divorced. In the results of the overall study, there was found to be an increase in love ratings for one's partner and parental interference. Interference did seem to have other frustrating effects, as it also was associated with decreased trust, increased criticalness, and increased frequency of negative, bothersome behaviors.

Subsequent development
While Driscoll's study has not been replicated, researchers have continued to discuss parental influence on relationship stability.  

In 1983, Malcolm Parks conducted a study to determine influences of peers and families on relationship involvement, which showed little to no support of Driscoll's previous research. Opposition from the partner's family was not associated with greater emotional attachment. These findings set the path for many other studies on romantic involvement and support systems involvement and approval.

Contemporary research
In recent years, much focus has been placed around the topic of a "Romeo and Juliet Effect." In 2001, Diane Felmlee found similar findings to Malcolm Parks's study. For instance, perceptions of approval from an individual's friends and approval from a partner's family members reduce the possibility that a relationship will end. 

Susan Sprecher's study further delved into the subject of the influence of social networks on relationships. It found that individuals from a social network believed that their personal opinions, whether of support or opposition, affected the romantic relationships they had earlier acknowledged as  being in their social networks.  

H. Colleen Sinclair found that friends' approval or disapproval had a great effect on the participants' perception of a potential dating partner. Similarly to the previously discussed studies, Sinclair and colleagues found no significant support for the "Romeo and Juliet Effect."

See also
Reactance (psychology)

References

Further reading
Brehm, J. W. (1999). The intensity of emotion. Personality And Social Psychology Review, 3(1), 2-22. 
Parks, M. R., Stan, C. M., & Eggert, L. L. (1983). Romantic involvement and social network involvement. Social Psychology Quarterly, 46(2), 116-131. 
Wright, B. L., & Sinclair, H.C. (2012a). Pulling the strings: Effects of friend and parent opinions on dating choices. Personal Relationships. .

Intimate relationships
Effect
Parenting
Interpersonal conflict
Romance
Psychological effects